Cephalaspidida is an extinct order of jawless fish in the subclass Cornuata.

See also 
 Undichna, a fish-fin, or fish-swimming fossil trail left as a fossil impression on a substrate, or the opposite impression on an overlying substrate
 Anatol Heintz (1898–1975), a Norwegian palaeontologist who published in 1939 Cephalaspida from Downtonian of Norway, about cephalaspida excavated at Ringerike.

References 

  J. A. Moy-Thomas and R. S. Mile. 1971. Palaeozoic Fishes

External links 

 
 Cephalaspidida at fossilworks.org (retrieved 16 April 2016)

Osteostraci
Prehistoric jawless fish orders